LoveyDove is an American pop and roll band that formed in February 2011 by Philadelphia-born Azalia Snail and California native Dan West.

Early life and influences 
LoveyDove is a musical duo known for being "as visually interesting as they are sonically enjoyable" with "shimmering, tandem harmonies". The duo is Dan West, a "psych-rock virtuoso musical maestro" on Fender VI, guitars, keys and vocals, and Azalia Snail, a "lo-fi indie rock pioneer" on keys, vocals and percussion. Their sound is described as "melodic soulful pop with eloquent grooves and seductive hooks, modern bubblegum pop, psychedelic rock with a sophisticated clarity."

The Los Angeles Times has called LoveyDove "an extraordinarily perfected and intricate band of modern, underground pop" who "specialize in creamy, enigmatic confections of pastel-toned psychedelia and intricately arranged experimental pop." They also noted LoveyDove's "consistently impressive" songs, which feature drummer Jerry Buscek, as "impeccably executed, intricately arranged and featuring a dazzling range of instruments - harpsichords, woodwinds, cellos, distorted fuzz guitar ... They have reached for, and attained, a near Olympian artistic plateau." LA Weekly said, "LoveyDove ... never fail to flabbergast," describing their sound as "deliciously chewy, loaded with dynamics, color and articulate lyrics that are both acutely chosen and shrewdly applied."

Snail, who has been called "The Female Beck", "The Female Syd Barrett," the "Lo-Fi Empress", the "psych auteur", and, by the radio station WMFU, the "Queen of Lo-Fi", is a solo artist whose career spans over 20 albums and singles. She has performed with alt-rock icons including Sebadoh, Trumans Water, Low, and Stereolab, and scored films for feature films, short films, and MTV's Ain't Nuthin' But A She Thing. The Miami New Times called her a "singular talent" and described her music as, "Imagine stripping off all the studio layers of (T Rex, Roxy Music, and Mott the Hoople), retaining their Oscar Wilde-ian lyrical and structural flights of fancy, and channeling it through a muse with an ethereal, dream-pop-worthy voice."

Dan West is an LA-based recording artist and studio musician whose catalogue includes solo albums and numerous collaborations. West, a multi-instrumentalist, first made his mark on the Paisley Underground scene, known for its ties to Mazzy Star, its name acquisition by Prince's Paisley Park Records and The Bangles. He was called a "multifaceted, ferociously gifted musician" by LA Weekly and "a psychedelic musician [who] possesses a disgustingly alchemical load of talent" with "technical precision worthy of an astrophysicist" by the Los Angeles Times.  He has been featured on Rodney Bingenheimer's "Rodney on the ROQ" radio show and performed live and in the studio with Sky Saxon, Bryan Maclean of Love, and Rosemary Clooney.

The duo has cited Trio, Teddybears, Illyah Kuryahkin, Dusty Springfield, T Rex, The Kinks, Love, Doves, The Troggs, Petula Clark, The Monkees, The Beatles, Lou Reed, Debussy, Stravinsky, Love American Style, Mary Tyler Moore, and Dick Van Dyke as influences, in addition to acknowledging that their collaborative music, praised as "high-grade modernist pop", is informed by their respective solo careers.

West and Snail met in Los Angeles and are a real life couple who married on April 25, 2014. They credit their success to being on the same page musically and the fact that they love playing music together. They chose the name LoveyDove after Snail wrote a song for West called LoveyDove. He followed up with a song for her titled Azalia's in Bloom. LA Weekly likened LoveyDove to "something like Sonny & Cher, except really good."

West told the Los Angeles Times, "LoveyDove plays positive uplifting music. For us, it's time to feel good, to climb up out of the darkness." Snail added, "When I was a teenager, I was full of angst, hatred, I had so much confusion and anger, such a downtrodden view of the world. So, now, we want to lift people out of their potential doldrums, to stop all the negativity, to accentuate the positive, as corny as that sounds."

Tours 
LoveyDove has toured the United States, Europe and Australasia. In February 2015, they performed across New Zealand with King Missile IV, led by John S. Hall, after their New Zealand record label Powertool Records invited King Missile IV to join them. Later that year, LoveyDove and d'Animal did a headlining tour of Europe from October 20 to November 12, 2015. They performed songs from their self-titled debut album and their follow-up album ShowStopper in the UK, France, Spain, the Netherlands and Germany.

They have also performed at multiple live venues in Los Angeles, including the Ace Hotel, The Teragram Ballroom, Harvard & Stone, Taix, Viva Cantina, El Cid, the Dresden, and at The Grammy Museum, where they sang with the legendary singer Melanie.

Discography 
LoveyDove's first self-titled album was released in the US in by LA's Fine. L.A. Record praised their debut album, saying, "Not since Wings wrote "Silly Love Songs" has a couple captured a love so sugary and yet so recognizable to those who have ever tasted the good stuff." The album references Shakespeare, Brian Wilson, Sergio Mendes, and Burt Bacharach. Their music was described as a "sonic and seductive collaboration," "unusually irresistible" and "one of LA's choicest homegrown sensations" by LA Weekly.

Their second album Showstopper was released in New Zealand by Powertool Records and in the US by Records Ad Nauseam. L.A. Record called the album "an eclectic and electrically exciting blend of excellent songwriting and pinpoint precise production, with melodies to live by and a dance beat to die for!" LA Weekly said, ""With their new album, Showstopper, a 13-bombon blast of harmonious psych-pop confections, the local (duo) have outdone themselves. Sweet, savory, gorgeously rendered and painstakingly arranged, every track is a masterly example of their complex bubble-gum simplicity - a cunning, stunning contradiction that reliably engages the brain as it reaches deep into the soul. It's an approach the pair has long since perfected, but on Showstopper, it's displayed in even fuller, richer form than ever before." ShowStopper also featured synth-pop artist Allene Norton of Cellars and King Missile artist John S. Hall. It was produced and arranged by West.

Snail Meets West, released by Union Pole in 2015, is the free-jazz duo of indie mainstay Azalia Snail and psychedelic maestro Dan West. Both have a long resume of various pop and roll projects, including LoveyDove. Snail Meets West is a tribute to the late free jazz pioneer Ornette Coleman who influenced many musicians. Snail plays drums and West plays piano.

Their music has been aired on SiriusXM Satellite Radio and KXRN-LP.

LoveyDove recorded the track Bernie's Air in support of US presidential candidate Bernie Sanders.

Awards and nominations 
Snail, of LoveyDove, won the LA Weekly Music Award for Best New Genre in 2000.

References 

Musical groups established in 2011
American pop rock music groups
2011 establishments in California